Lixus terminalis is a species of true weevil in the beetle family Curculionidae.

References

Further reading

 
 

Lixinae
Articles created by Qbugbot
Beetles described in 1876